Singles Collection +4 is the first greatest hits album by Japanese pop-rock band Field of View. It was released on 8 October 1997 under Zain Records. Album includes all singles released from "Ano Toki no Naka de Bokura wa" until "Kono Machi de Kimi to Kurashitai". Four new songs were released exclusively for this album. The album reached #3 in its first week and sold 142,030. The album charted for 7 weeks and sold more than 438,000 copies.

Track listing

Cover
Miho Komatsu covered Oozora he on her 6th album, Hanano and Kono Machi de Kimi to Kurashitai on her debut album, Nazo. Zard covered Last Good-bye on their last studio album, Kimi to no Distance; Kimi ga Ita kara, Totsuzen and Dan Dan Kokoro ga Hikareteku on their 7th studio album, Today Is Another Day.

Usage in media
Dan Dan Kokoro Hikareteku was used as the opening theme for the anime series Dragon Ball GT
Doki was used in a commercial for All Nippon Airways as part of promoting their "ANA's Paradise" service.
Last Good-bye was used as the ending theme for the Tokyo Broadcasting System Television drama "Discovery of the World's Mysteries".
Kimi ga Ita Kara was used as theme song for the Fuji TV drama "Kagayaku Kisetsu no Naka de".
Totsuzen was used in a commercial for Pocari Sweat.
Mayowanaide was used as the ending theme for the TV Asahi program "Mokugeki! Dokyun".
Kono Machi de Kimi to Kurashitai was used as the ending theme for the TV Asahi program "Chou Jigen Time Bomber".
 Ano Toki no Naka de Bokura wa was used in a commercial for 7-Eleven.

References

Being Inc. compilation albums
1997 compilation albums
Japanese-language compilation albums
Field of View albums